The Billboard Tropical Albums chart, published in Billboard magazine, is a record chart that features Latin music sales information. This data are compiled by Nielsen SoundScan from a sample that includes music stores, music departments at electronics and department stores, Internet sales (both physical and digital) and verifiable sales from concert venues in the United States.

Below is a list of albums that number-one on the Tropical Albums chart during the 1990s. Until July 17, 1993, charts were posted bi-weekly.

Number one albums
Key
 – Best-selling Tropical album of the year

References
General

 For information about every week of this chart for the 1990s, follow this link; in the chart date section select a date and the top ten positions for the week selected will appear on screen, including the number-one album, which is shown in the table above. 

Specific

Tropical 1990s
United States Tropical Albums
1990s in Latin music
Tropical music albums